Cerreto Sannita is a comune (municipality) in the Province of Benevento in the Italian region Campania, located about 60 km northeast of Naples and about 25 km northwest of Benevento.

Cerreto Sannita borders the following municipalities: Cusano Mutri, Guardia Sanframondi, Morcone, Pietraroja, Pontelandolfo, San Lorenzello, San Lupo.

The town was completely destroyed by the 1688 Sannio earthquake, and rebuilt in a different position.

References

External links

Cities and towns in Campania